S. Ilakuvan (1910–1973) was a Tamil college teacher who was imprisoned in 1965 for his participation in the anti-Hindi agitations. He wrote in 1971.

Ilakuvan, who Tamilized his given Sanskritic name, states: "They may ask what’s in a name. One’s name is everything. Tamilians should only bear Tamil names. Those who refuse this cannot be devotees of Tamil" (Ilakuvanar 1971: 4). Today, of course, many Tamil speakers, and not just those overtly devoted to the language, bear personal names containing the word "Tamil," such as Tamilcelvi, "daughter of Tamil" Tamilanban, "lover of Tamil" Tamilarasi, "Queen Tamil" even Tamilpitthan, "mad about Tamil."

He also coined the phrase ).

References

1910 births
1973 deaths
Tamil language activists